The Ohio and Erie Canal Towpath Trail is a multi-use trail that follows part of the former route of the Ohio & Erie Canal in Northeast Ohio.

The trail runs from north to south through Cuyahoga, Summit, Stark, and Tuscarawas counties. When completed, it will run from Cleveland in the north to New Philadelphia in the south.
The Ohio to Erie Trail follows a portion of the towpath trail in Northeast Ohio. The Great American Rail-Trail will follow another portion of the trail, from Clinton southward.

The towpath trail has been developed by a number of organizations. It is currently managed by Cleveland Metroparks, Cuyahoga Valley National Park, Summit Metro Parks, Stark Parks, and the Tuscarawas County Park Department.

Regula was honored for his support in Congress for the Ohio & Erie National Heritage Canalway.

The trail has multiple surface types including asphalt, cement, concrete, crushed limestone and hard-packed earth.

Location
The trail currently consists of four segments of trails connected by short portions of roadway. The segments are, from north to south:

Steelyards Common segment
North terminus at W 14th St. and Quigley Rd. in Cleveland: 
South terminus on Jennings Rd. in Cleveland: 

Cleveland to Massillon segment
North terminus on Harvard Road in Cleveland: 

Massillon to Bolivar segment

Bolivar to Zoar segment
North terminus at Fort Laurens State Memorial south of Bolivar: 
Intersection with Zoar Valley Trail southeast of Zoar: 
South terminus at Canal Lands Park on Dover-Zoar Rd. in Zoar: 

Zoar to Zoarville segment
North terminus at Canal Lands Park in Dover-Zoar Rd. in Zoar: 
South terminus at Zoarville Station Bridge:

Events 
 Annual Towpath Marathon, Half-Marathon, and Ten-Ten Races.
 Annual Towpath Trail Century Ride
 Canal Corridor 100 Mile Endurance Run

See also 

 Cleveland Metroparks
 Cuyahoga Valley National Park
 Ohio & Erie Canalway National Heritage Area
 Summit Metro Parks

References

External links 
 Ohio and Erie Canalway National Heritage Area
 Canalway Partners
 Welcome to the Ohio & Erie Canalway Coalition

Bike paths in Ohio
Hiking trails in Ohio